Cyathostemon blackettii is a member of the family Myrtaceae endemic to Western Australia.

It is found in an area along the south coast extending from the Great Southern and into the south western Goldfields-Esperance regions of Western Australia.

References

blackettii
Plants described in 2012
Taxa named by Ferdinand von Mueller